is a city located in Aomori Prefecture, Japan. ,  the city had an estimated population of 31,540 in 13948 households  and a population density of 150 persons per km2.

Geography
Kuroishi is located in west-central Aomori Prefecture, bordered by the Hakkōda Mountains to be east. The urban area is on the western edge of the city. Part of the city is within the borders of the Kuroishi Onsenkyō Prefectural Natural Park.

Neighboring municipalities
Aomori Prefecture
Aomori
Hirakawa
Fujisaki
Inakadate

Climate
The city has a cold humid continental climate (Köppen Dfa) characterized by warm short summers and long cold winters with heavy snowfall. The average annual temperature in Kuroishi is 9.6 °C. The average annual rainfall is 1343 mm with September as the wettest month. The temperatures are highest on average in August, at around 23.3 °C, and lowest in January, at around -2.9 °C.

Demographics
Per Japanese census data, the population of Kuroishi has declined over the past 40 years.

History
The area of Kuroishi was part of the holdings of the Tsugaru clan of Hirosaki Domain in the Edo period, and became the semi-independent Kuroishi Domain in 1809. The Nakamachi neighborhood has rows of shops connected by a  covered arcade. This arcade dates from 1656 and is a Registered Tangible Cultural Property.  After the Meiji Restoration, the town of Kuroishi was established in within Minamitsugaru District in Aomori Prefecture with the establishment of the modern municipalities system on April 1, 1889. The city was founded on 1 July 1954, from the merger of the town of Kuroishi absorbing the villages of Nakagō, Rokugō, Yamagata and Aseishi. On 1 October 1956, Kuroishi absorbed a portion of the neighboring town of Onoe.

Government
Kuroishi has a mayor-council form of government with a directly elected mayor and a unicameral city legislature of 16 members. Kuroishi contributes one member to the Aomori Prefectural Assembly. In terms of national politics, the city is part of Aomori 3rd district of the lower house of the Diet of Japan.

Economy
The economy of Kuroishi is heavily dependent on agriculture. The city serves as a minor regional commercial center. Agricultural produce includes rice and apples.

Education
Kuroishi has four public elementary schools and two public junior high schools operated by the city government and two public high schools operated by the Aomori Prefectural Board of Education. The prefecture also operates one special education school for the handicapped.

Transportation

Railway
  Kōnan Railway Company - Kōnan Line
  -

Highway

Sister city relations
 – Wenatchee, Washington, United States – from 1971
 – Yeongcheon, Gyeongsangbuk-do, South Korea – from 1984

Local attractions
Kuroishi Neputa Festival
Kuroishi Onsenkyō Prefectural Natural Park
Kanehiranari-en, National Place of Scenic Beauty <
Nakamachi Komise Street, Registered Tangible Cultural Property 
Nakano Momiji Mountain
Tsugaru Traditional Crafts Centre

Noted people from Kuroishi
Ujaku Akita, playwright, author of children's books
Takahito Kudo, professional baseball player

References

External links

 
Cities in Aomori Prefecture